The Javelin V6 STOL is an American STOL homebuilt aircraft that was designed and produced by Javelin Aircraft of Wichita, Kansas. When it was available the aircraft was supplied in the form of plans for amateur construction.

Design and development
The V6 STOL consists of plans to power an existing certified Piper PA-20 Pacer airframe with a Ford Motor Company V6 engine and moving it from the Certified Category to the Experimental Amateur-built category.

The aircraft features a strut-braced high wing, a four-seat enclosed cabin accessed via doors, fixed conventional landing gear and a single engine in tractor configuration.

Since it uses a standard Piper Pacer airframe, the aircraft is made from welded steel tubing, covered in  doped aircraft fabric. The standard conversion installs a  Ford V6 powerplant, driving a fixed pitch propeller, although engines of up to  can be employed.

The manufacturer estimates the time to complete the conversion from the supplied plans as 400 hours.

Operational history
In January 2014, 14 examples were registered in the United States with the Federal Aviation Administration, but a total of 25 had been registered at one time.

Specifications (V6 STOL)

References

External links
Photo of a Javelin V6 STOL

V6 STOL
1990s United States civil utility aircraft
Single-engined tractor aircraft
High-wing aircraft
Homebuilt aircraft